Mormogystia brandstetteri is a moth in the family Cossidae. It is endemic to the Socotra Archipelago, part of Yemen in the Indian Ocean.

The wingspan is 33–35 mm. The ground colour of the forewings is black. The head, thorax and abdomen are intense grey. There is a black costal spot on the ventral hindwing

The larvae probably feed on Acacia species.

Etymology
The species is dedicated to Johann Brandstetter, a German painter and entomologist.

References

Moths described in 2011
Cossinae
Endemic fauna of Socotra